Makhado FM is a community radio station based in the small town of Louis Trichardt in the Makhado Local Municipality of South Africa. It covers a radius of a few kilometres away from the town and is found on the 107.3 FM. It caters for all age groups.

Community radio stations in South Africa
Defunct radio stations in South Africa
Mass media in Limpopo